Focus Services LLC is a privately owned call center service provider, specializing in multi-product telesales and customer relationship management founded in 1995. It has locations in the United States, El Salvador, Nicaragua, and the Philippines.

It offers product direct sales support services, including television ads, radio spots, Internet promotions, and direct mailers; customer service support; and technical support services. It also offers third party quality assurance/monitoring, sales order processing verification, and customer experience survey services to companies, including outsource vendors.

Focus has over 3,000 employees working in 12 Focus facilities, both domestically and internationally. It operates as Focus Direct Inc. (or Focus Direct Inc. - Bacolod) in the Philippines and as Focus El Salvador in El Salvador, both subsidiaries of Focus Services.

Locations
United States
Roy, Utah, Headquarters
Greenville, North Carolina
Tarboro, North Carolina
Clinton, Iowa
Dubuque, Iowa
Jacksonville, Florida
Beaumont, Texas

El Salvador
San Salvador

Nicaragua
Managua

Philippines
Bacolod

See also
 Business process outsourcing
 Offshore outsourcing
 Call center industry in the Philippines

References

External links
 Official website

Outsourcing companies